On 10 April 2022, a gang of bandits killed more than 150 people in a series of attacks in Plateau State, Nigeria. The attacks are linked to the ongoing Nigerian bandit conflict. About 70 people were also kidnapped in the attacks.

Background

Nigeria is badly affected by several low-intensity conflicts. These include the Boko Haram insurgency, which began in 2009, and the Nigerian bandit conflict, which began in 2011.

In the early 2020s, bandit attacks increased. The week before the attack, bandits carried out a major attack on a military base in Kaduna State, killing 15 soldiers. An attack on a harvest festival that week killed 17. A few weeks before, an attack on a train heading to Kaduna killed upwards of 60 passengers. 

The day of the attack, bandits killed 15 people in an unrelated incident. The massacre happened in a village in Chikun, Kaduna State. Local community leader Isiaku Madaki, who had been installed less than a day before, was among the dead.

Attack
On the afternoon of 10 April 2022, a bandit gang, believed to be Fulani herdsmen, attacked nine villages in Plateau State. All the villages were in the Kanam and Wase local government areas. Gunmen killed at least 50 people and kidnapped about 70 others. They also torched and looted houses during the rampage.

Victims who died in the attacks were buried in mass graves in Kanam.

While Nigerian president Muhammadu Buhari vowed that there will be "no mercy" for the perpetrators of these attacks, leaders of the local communities called for his resignation for his failure to maintain order and security.

Casualties
Initial reports and authorities said that at least 50 had been killed. Witnesses told the Associated Press that the death toll was more than 100, with others placing the estimate as high as at least 130. On 11 April, Voice of America stated at least 70 had been slain. Vanguard reported at least 78 people had been killed in Kanam and 15 others in Chikun during the attacks.

See also
List of massacres in Nigeria

References

2022 murders in Nigeria
2020s massacres in Nigeria
2022 massacres
April 2022 crimes in Africa

Arson in Nigeria
Arson in the 2020s
Attacks on buildings and structures in 2022
Attacks on buildings and structures in Nigeria
2022 massacres
Kidnappings in Nigeria
Looting in Africa
Mass kidnappings of the 2020s
Massacres in 2022
Terrorist incidents in Nigeria in 2022
April 2022 events in Nigeria
Attacks in Nigeria in 2022